Préjano is a village and municipality of la Rioja Baja, in the autonomous community of La Rioja, Spain. It is located on the left bank of the Ruesca river, tributary of the Cidacos. It is a former mining village, nowadays its inhabitants are supported by agriculture or work in industry of the nearby Arnedo, capital of the comarca.

Demography 
As of January 2010 the population of the municipality was 237 inhabitants, 128 men and 109 women.

Places of interest 
 Castle of Préjano, 15th-century tower with a pentagonal base reinforced by inclined walls.
 Hermitage of Santo Cristo de la Canal
 Church of San Miguel, Préjano, from the 16th century
 Parish church of Saint Esteban
 Trujal, the most ancient olive oil press of La Rioja, still in use by the local cooperative.

References 

Municipalities in La Rioja (Spain)